The Moorabbin Rugby Union Football Club, is a rugby union football club based in Moorabbin, Victoria, Australia. Nicknamed the Rams, the club's home ground is located in Keys Road reserve in Cheltenham and was found in 1965. The club's colours are black and white.

History 
Moorabbin rugby union football club was founded in 1965. The club was formed with players that came from the St Kilda Marlins and the Kiwi rugby clubs. The former Marlins jersey was adopted by the club and it remains the current Moorabbin jersey design.

The Moorabbin Rams have been a fierce club since entering the competition and have continued to produce elite players that have gone on to play Super Rugby, Premiership Rugby, United Rugby Championship, Top 14, Japan Rugby League One and also test rugby for their respective Nation.

Honours 
 1st Grade Premiers (Dewar Shield since 1909): 1978, 1981, 1982, 1983, 1984, 1985, 1986, 1988, 1990, 1991, 1994, 1995, 2002, 2005, 2012
 Victorian Club Champions (Cowper Shield): 1986, 1987, 1990, 1991, 1992, 1993, 1994, 1995, 1996, 2002, 2005, 2006, 2007, 2008

Players of note 
 Pete Samu - ACT Brumbies / Wallabies 
 Sione Tuipolutu - Glasgow Warriors / Scotland
 Pone Fa'amausili - Melbourne Rebels / Wallabies 
 Rodney Iona - ACT Brumbies / Samoa
 Theo McFarland -  Saracens / Samoa
 John Ulugia - ASM Clermont Auvergne
 Sinoti Sinoti - Newcastle Falcons / Samoa
 Tony Lamborn - Auckland Blues / USA
 Tetera Faulkner - NSW Waratahs / Wallabies 
 James Kamana - Kamaishi Seawaves 
 Afaesetiti Amosa - Aviron Bayonnais / Samoa

References

External links 
  Moorabbin RUFC website

Rugby union teams in Victoria (Australia)
Rugby clubs established in 1965
Sporting clubs in Melbourne
1965 establishments in Australia
Sport in the City of Kingston (Victoria)